John Clark may refer to:

Entertainment
John Clark or Signor Brocolini (1841–1906), Irish-born American operatic singer and actor
John Clark (actor) (born 1932), English actor and theatre director
John Clark (American actor) (1933–2011), mainly in Spaghetti Westerns
John Clark (musician) (born 1944), American jazz horn player and composer
John Clark (born 1978), Scottish indie/electronic musician from the band Bis who is also known as John Disco
John Drury Clark (1907–1988), American author, chemist and rocket scientist
John Heaviside Clark (c. 1771–1836), Scottish engraver and painter

Military
John Clark (spy), American spy during the American Revolutionary War
John George Walters Clark (1892–1948), British army officer
John W. Clark (Medal of Honor) (1830–1898), American soldier in the American Civil War

Politics

American 
John Clark (Delaware governor) (1761–1821), American governor and farmer of Delaware
John Clark (Georgia governor) (1766–1832), American politician and governor of Georgia
John Clark (Minnesota politician) (c. 1825–1904), Minnesota state senator
John Clark (Utah politician) (1834–1908), mayor of Salt Lake City, Utah
John Bullock Clark (1802–1885), American politician and U.S. representative from Missouri and Confederate congressman
John Bullock Clark Jr. (1831–1903), American politician and U.S. representative from Missouri
John C. Clark (1793–1852), American politician and U.S. representative from New York
John Davidson Clark (1884–1961), American lawyer, member of the Council of Economic Advisers (1946–1953)
John E. Clark (politician) (1910–2003), American politician and judge
John F. Clark, ninth director of the United States Marshals Service
John Gee Clark (1890–1984), member of the California legislature
John M. Clark (1821–1902), Sheriff of Suffolk County, Massachusetts
John T. Clark, American politician and civil engineer from New York

Canadian 
John Clark (Canadian politician) (1835–1896), Scottish-born politician in Ontario, Canada
John Arthur Clark (1886–1976), Conservative member of the Canadian House of Commons
John Etter Clark (1915–1956), member of the Legislative Assembly of Alberta, 1952–1959

Other 
John Allworth Clark (1846–1932), Australian politician - mayor of Brisbane
John Clark (Roundhead) (fl. 1650s), English member of parliament and colonel in Cromwell's army
John Harrison Clark (c. 1860–1927), Cape Colony adventurer who ruled much of southern Zambia
John Clark (Australian politician) (1907–1984), sat in the South Australian House of Assembly

Science and academics
John Brown Clark (1861–1947), mathematician, Vice President of the Royal Society of Edinburgh
J. Desmond Clark (1916–2002), British archaeologist
J. P. Clark (John Pepper Clark-Bekederemo, 1935–2020), Nigerian poet and professor
John Bates Clark (1847–1938), American economist
John Drury Clark (1907–1988), American author (as John D. Clark), chemist and rocket scientist
John E. Clark (born 1952), American anthropologist
John Frank Clark, American Africanist and professor of International Relations
John Gordon Clark (1926–1999), Harvard psychiatrist and pioneer cult researcher
John Maurice Clark (1884–1963), American economist
John S. Clark (1885–1956), Scottish entomologist
John Walter Clark (born 1935), American physicist
John Willis Clark (1833–1910), English academic and antiquarian

Sports
John Clark (basketball), member of the Northeastern University athletics Hall of Fame
John Clark (boxer) (1849–1922), Irish-American bare-knuckle boxer
Johnny Clark, (1947–2020), English boxer
John Clark (cricketer) (born 1928), Australian cricketer
John Clark (English footballer), footballer for Bradford City and Cardiff City
John Clark (footballer, born 1941), footballer formerly with Celtic F.C., one of the Lisbon Lions
John Clark (footballer, born 1964), footballer formerly with Dundee United
John Clark (rugby league) (died 2011), English rugby league footballer of the 1950s and 1960s
John Clark (Australian rower) (born 1948), Australian rower
John Clark (New Zealand rower) (born 1944), New Zealand rower

Other
John Clark (physician) (1744–1805), Scottish medical practitioner in Newcastle upon Tyne
John Clark (chaplain) (1784–1853), American clergyman who served as chaplain of the senate
John Clark (land agent) (died 1807), Scottish writer
John Kinzie Clark (1792–1865), trader, trapper and early settler in the Chicago area
John Howard Clark (1830–1878), editor of The South Australian Register, 1870–1877
John Kirkland Clark (1877–1963), New York City assistant district attorney
John Allen Clark (1926–2001), British businessman
John Clark (Tom Clancy character), character in Tom Clancy novels
John Clark Jr., detective in the American television series NYPD Blue

See also
Jon Clark (disambiguation)
John Bates Clark Medal, an award given by the American Economic Association
John Clark Field, a multi-use stadium in Plano, Texas, United States
Capt. John Clark House, a historic house near Canterbury, Connecticut, United States
John Clark House (Clarksdale, Mississippi), a historic house in Clarksdale, Mississippi, United States
John Clarke (disambiguation)
John Clerk (disambiguation)
John Clerke (disambiguation)
Jonathan Clark (disambiguation)